Monetary policy is the policy adopted by the monetary authority of a nation to control either the interest rate payable for very short-term borrowing (borrowing by banks from each other to meet their short-term needs) or the money supply, often as an attempt to reduce inflation or the interest rate, to ensure price stability and general trust of the value and stability of the nation's currency.

Monetary policy is a modification of the supply of money, i.e. "printing" more money, or decreasing the money supply by changing interest rates or removing excess reserves. This is in contrast to fiscal policy, which relies on taxation, government spending, and government borrowing as methods for a government to manage business cycle phenomena such as recessions.

Further purposes of a monetary policy are usually to contribute to the stability of gross domestic product, to achieve and maintain low unemployment, and to maintain predictable exchange rates with other currencies.

Monetary economics can provide insight into crafting optimal monetary policy. In developed countries, monetary policy is generally formed separately from fiscal policy.

Monetary policy is referred to as being either expansionary or contractionary.

Expansionary policy occurs when a monetary authority uses its procedures to stimulate the economy. An expansionary policy maintains short-term interest rates at a lower than usual rate or increases the total supply of money in the economy more rapidly than usual. It is traditionally used to try to reduce unemployment during a recession by decreasing interest rates in the hope that less expensive credit will entice businesses into borrowing more money and thereby expanding. This would increase aggregate demand (the overall demand for all goods and services in an economy), which would increase short-term growth as measured by increase of gross domestic product (GDP). Expansionary monetary policy, by increasing the amount of currency in circulation, usually diminishes the value of the currency relative to other currencies (the exchange rate), in which case foreign purchasers will be able to purchase more with their currency in the country with the devalued currency.

Contractionary policy maintains short-term interest rates greater than usual, slows the rate of growth of the money supply, or even decreases it to slow short-term economic growth and lessen inflation. Contractionary policy can result in increased unemployment and depressed borrowing and spending by consumers and businesses, which can eventually result in an economic recession if implemented too vigorously.

History
Monetary policy is associated with interest rates and availability of credit. Instruments of monetary policy have included short-term interest rates and bank reserves through the monetary base.

For many centuries there were only two forms of monetary policy: altering coinage or the printing of paper money. Interest rates, while now thought of as part of monetary authority, were not generally coordinated with the other forms of monetary policy during this time. Monetary policy was considered as an executive decision, and was generally implemented by the authority with seigniorage (the power to coin). With the advent of larger trading networks came the ability to define the currency value in terms of gold or silver, and the price of the local currency in terms of foreign currencies. This official price could be enforced by law, even if it varied from the market price.

Paper money originated from promissory notes termed "jiaozi" in 7th century China. Jiaozi did not replace metallic currency, and were used alongside the copper coins. The succeeding Yuan Dynasty was the first government to use paper currency as the predominant circulating medium. In the later course of the dynasty, facing massive shortages of specie to fund war and maintain their rule, they began printing paper money without restrictions, resulting in hyperinflation.

With the creation of the Bank of England in 1694, which was granted the authority to print notes backed by gold, the idea of monetary policy as independent of executive action began to be established. The purpose of monetary policy was to maintain the value of the coinage, print notes which would trade at par to specie, and prevent coins from leaving circulation. The establishment of national banks by industrializing nations was associated then with the desire to maintain the currency's relationship to the gold standard, and to trade in a narrow currency band with other gold-backed currencies. To accomplish this end, national banks as part of the gold standard began setting the interest rates that they charged both their own borrowers and other banks which required money for liquidity. The maintenance of a gold standard required almost monthly adjustments of interest rates.

The gold standard is a system by which the price of the national currency is fixed vis-a-vis the value of gold, and is kept constant by the government's promise to buy or sell gold at a fixed price in terms of the base currency. The gold standard might be regarded as a special case of "fixed exchange rate" policy, or as a special type of commodity price level targeting.

Nowadays this type of monetary policy is no longer used by any country.

During the period 1870–1920, the industrialized nations established central banking systems, with one of the last being the Federal Reserve in 1913. By this time the role of the central bank as the "lender of last resort" was established. It was also increasingly understood that interest rates had an effect on the entire economy, in no small part because of appreciation for the marginal revolution in economics, which demonstrated that people would change their decisions based on changes in their economic trade-offs.

Monetarist economists long contended that the money-supply growth could affect the macroeconomy. These included Milton Friedman who early in his career advocated that government budget deficits during recessions be financed in equal amount by money creation to help to stimulate aggregate demand for production. Later he advocated simply increasing the monetary supply at a low, constant rate, as the best way of maintaining low inflation and stable production growth. However, when U.S. Federal Reserve Chairman Paul Volcker tried this policy, starting in October 1979, it was found to be impractical, because of the unstable relationship between monetary aggregates and other macroeconomic variables. Even Milton Friedman later acknowledged that direct money supplying was less successful than he had hoped.

Therefore, monetary decisions presently take into account a wider range of factors, such as:
 short-term interest rates;
 long-term interest rates;
 velocity of money through the economy;
 exchange rates;
 credit quality;
 bonds and equities (debt and corporate ownership);
 government versus private sector spending and savings;
 international capital flows of money on large scales;
 financial derivatives such as options, swaps, and futures contracts

Monetary policy instruments 
The main monetary policy instruments available to central banks are open market operation, bank reserve requirement, interest rate policy, re-lending and re-discount (including using the term repurchase market), and credit policy (often coordinated with trade policy). While capital adequacy is important, it is defined and regulated by the Bank for International Settlements, and central banks in practice generally do not apply stricter rules.

Conventional instrument 
The central bank influences interest rates by expanding or contracting the monetary base, which consists of currency in circulation and banks' reserves on deposit at the central bank.
Central banks have three main methods of monetary policy: open market operations, the discount rate and the reserve requirements.

Key Interest rates & refinancing operations 
By far the most visible and obvious power of many modern central banks is to influence market interest rates; contrary to popular belief, they rarely "set" rates to a fixed number. Although the mechanism differs from country to country, most use a similar mechanism based on a central bank's ability to create as much fiat money as required.

The mechanism to move the market towards a 'target rate' (whichever specific rate is used) is generally to lend money or borrow money in theoretically unlimited quantities until the targeted market rate is sufficiently close to the target. Central banks may do so by lending money to and borrowing money from (taking deposits from) a limited number of qualified banks, or by purchasing and selling bonds. As an example of how this functions, the Bank of Canada sets a target overnight rate, and a band of plus or minus 0.25%. Qualified banks borrow from each other within this band, but never above or below, because the central bank will always lend to them at the top of the band, and take deposits at the bottom of the band; in principle, the capacity to borrow and lend at the extremes of the band are unlimited. Other central banks use similar mechanisms.The target rates are generally short-term rates. The actual rate that borrowers and lenders receive on the market will depend on (perceived) credit risk, maturity and other factors. For example, a central bank might set a target rate for overnight lending of 4.5%, but rates for (equivalent risk) five-year bonds might be 5%, 4.75%, or, in cases of inverted yield curves, even below the short-term rate. Many central banks have one primary "headline" rate that is quoted as the "central bank rate". In practice, they will have other tools and rates that are used, but only one that is rigorously targeted and enforced.

"The rate at which the central bank lends money can indeed be chosen at will by the central bank; this is the rate that makes the financial headlines." Henry C.K. Liu explains further that "the U.S. central-bank lending rate is known as the Fed funds rate. The Fed sets a target for the Fed funds rate, which its Open Market Committee tries to match by lending or borrowing in the money market ... a fiat money system set by command of the central bank. The Fed is the head of the central-bank because the U.S. dollar is the key reserve currency for international trade. The global money market is a USA dollar market. All other currencies markets revolve around the U.S. dollar market." Accordingly, the U.S. situation is not typical of central banks in general.

Typically a central bank controls certain types of short-term interest rates. These influence the stock- and bond markets as well as mortgage and other interest rates. The European Central Bank, for example, announces its interest rate at the meeting of its Governing Council; in the case of the U.S. Federal Reserve, the Federal Reserve Board of Governors. Both the Federal Reserve and the ECB are composed of one or more central bodies that are responsible for the main decisions about interest rates and the size and type of open market operations, and several branches to execute its policies. In the case of the Federal Reserve, they are the local Federal Reserve Banks; for the ECB they are the national central banks.

A typical central bank has several interest rates or monetary policy tools it can set to influence markets.

 Marginal lending rate – a fixed rate for institutions to borrow money from the central bank. (In the USA this is called the discount rate).
 Main refinancing rate – the publicly visible interest rate the central bank announces. It is also known as minimum bid rate and serves as a bidding floor for refinancing loans. (In the USA this is called the federal funds rate).
 Deposit rate, generally consisting of interest on reserves and sometimes also interest on excess reserves – the rates parties receive for deposits at the central bank.

These rates directly affect the rates in the money market, the market for short-term loans.

Some central banks (e.g. in Denmark, Sweden and the Eurozone) are currently applying negative interest rates.

Open market operations 

Through open market operations, a central bank influences the money supply in an economy. Each time it buys securities (such as a government bond or treasury bill), it in effect creates money. The central bank exchanges money for the security, increasing the money supply while lowering the supply of the specific security. Conversely, selling of securities by the central bank reduces the money supply.Open market operations usually take the form of:

 Buying or selling securities ("direct operations") to achieve an interest rate target in the interbank market .
 Temporary lending of money for collateral securities ("Reverse Operations" or "repurchase operations", otherwise known as the "repo" market). These operations are carried out on a regular basis, where fixed maturity loans (of one week and one month for the ECB) are auctioned off.
 Foreign exchange operations such as foreign exchange swaps.

These interventions can also influence the foreign exchange market and thus the exchange rate. For example, the People's Bank of China and the Bank of Japan have on occasion bought several hundred billions of U.S. Treasuries, presumably in order to stop the decline of the U.S. dollar versus the renminbi and the yen.

Reserve requirements 

Historically, bank reserves have formed only a small fraction of deposits, a system called fractional-reserve banking. Banks would hold only a small percentage of their assets in the form of cash reserves as insurance against bank runs. Over time this process has been regulated and insured by central banks. Such legal reserve requirements were introduced in the 19th century as an attempt to reduce the risk of banks overextending themselves and suffering from bank runs, as this could lead to knock-on effects on other overextended banks. See also money multiplier.

As the early 20th century gold standard was undermined by inflation and the late 20th-century fiat dollar hegemony evolved, and as banks proliferated and engaged in more complex transactions and were able to profit from dealings globally on a moment's notice, these practices became mandatory, if only to ensure that there was some limit on the ballooning of money supply.

A number of central banks have since abolished their reserve requirements over the last few decades, beginning with the Reserve Bank of New Zealand in 1985 and continuing with the Federal Reserve in 2020. For the respective banking systems, bank capital requirements provide a check on the growth of the money supply.

The People's Bank of China retains (and uses) more powers over reserves because the yuan that it manages is a non-convertible currency.

Loan activity by banks plays a fundamental role in determining the money supply. The central-bank money after aggregate settlement – "final money" – can take only one of two forms:

 physical cash, which is rarely used in wholesale financial markets,
 central-bank money which is rarely used by the people

The currency component of the money supply is far smaller than the deposit component. Currency, bank reserves and institutional loan agreements together make up the monetary base, called M1, M2 and M3. The Federal Reserve Bank stopped publishing M3 and counting it as part of the money supply in 2006.

Credit guidance 

Central banks can directly or indirectly influence the allocation of bank lending in certain sectors of the economy by applying quotas, limits or differentiated interest rates. This allows the central bank to control both the quantity of lending and its allocation towards certain strategic sectors of the economy, for example to support the national industrial policy, or to environmental investment such as housing renovation.

The Bank of Japan used to apply such policy ("window guidance") between 1962 and 1991. The Banque de France also widely used credit guidance during the post-war period of 1948 until 1973 .

The European Central Bank's ongoing TLTROs operations can also be described as form of credit guidance insofar as the level of interest rate ultimately paid by banks is differentiated according to the volume of lending made by commercial banks at the end of the maintenance period. If commercial banks achieve a certain lending performance threshold, they get a discount interest rate, that is lower than the standard key interest rate. For this reason, some economists have described the TLTROs as a "dual interest rates" policy. China is also applying a form of dual rate policy.

Exchange requirements 
To influence the money supply, some central banks may require that some or all foreign exchange receipts (generally from exports) be exchanged for the local currency. The rate that is used to purchase local currency may be market-based or arbitrarily set by the bank. This tool is generally used in countries with non-convertible currencies or partially convertible currencies. The recipient of the local currency may be allowed to freely dispose of the funds, required to hold the funds with the central bank for some period of time, or allowed to use the funds subject to certain restrictions. In other cases, the ability to hold or use the foreign exchange may be otherwise limited.

In this method, money supply is increased by the central bank when it purchases the foreign currency by issuing (selling) the local currency. The central bank may subsequently reduce the money supply by various means, including selling bonds or foreign exchange interventions.

Collateral policy 
In some countries, central banks may have other tools that work indirectly to limit lending practices and otherwise restrict or regulate capital markets. For example, a central bank may regulate margin lending, whereby individuals or companies may borrow against pledged securities. The margin requirement establishes a minimum ratio of the value of the securities to the amount borrowed.

Central banks often have requirements for the quality of assets that may be held by financial institutions; these requirements may act as a limit on the amount of risk and leverage created by the financial system. These requirements may be direct, such as requiring certain assets to bear certain minimum credit ratings, or indirect, by the central bank lending to counter-parties only when security of a certain quality is pledged as collateral.

Forward guidance 

Forward guidance is a communication practice whereby the central bank announces its forecasts and future intentions to increase market expectations of future levels of interest rates.

Unconventional monetary policy at the zero bound
Other forms of monetary policy, particularly used when interest rates are at or near 0% and there are concerns about deflation or deflation is occurring, are referred to as unconventional monetary policy. These include credit easing, quantitative easing, forward guidance, and signalling. In credit easing, a central bank purchases private sector assets to improve liquidity and improve access to credit. Signaling can be used to lower market expectations for lower interest rates in the future. For example, during the credit crisis of 2008, the US Federal Reserve indicated rates would be low for an "extended period", and the Bank of Canada made a "conditional commitment" to keep rates at the lower bound of 25 basis points (0.25%) until the end of the second quarter of 2010.

Helicopter money 

Further heterodox monetary policy proposals include the idea of helicopter money whereby central banks would create money without assets as counterpart in their balance sheet. The money created could be distributed directly to the population as a citizen's dividend. Virtues of such money shock include the decrease of household risk aversion and the increase in demand, boosting both inflation and the output gap. This option has been increasingly discussed since March 2016 after the ECB's president Mario Draghi said he found the concept "very interesting". The idea was also promoted by prominent former central bankers Stanley Fischer and Philipp Hildebrand  in a paper published by BlackRock, and in France by economists Philippe Martin and Xavier Ragot from the French Council for Economic Analysis, a think tank attached to the Prime minister's office.

Some have envisaged the use of what Milton Friedman once called "helicopter money" whereby the central bank would make direct transfers to citizens in order to lift inflation up to the central bank's intended target. Such policy option could be particularly effective at the zero lower bound.

Nominal anchors
A nominal anchor for monetary policy is a single variable or device which the central bank uses to pin down expectations of private agents about the nominal price level or its path or about what the central bank might do with respect to achieving that path. Monetary regimes combine long-run nominal anchoring with flexibility in the short run. Nominal variables used as anchors primarily include exchange rate targets, money supply targets, and inflation targets with interest rate policy.

Types
In practice, to implement any type of monetary policy the main tool used is modifying the amount of base money in circulation. The monetary authority does this by buying or selling financial assets (usually government obligations). These open market operations change either the amount of money or its liquidity (if less liquid forms of money are bought or sold). The multiplier effect of fractional reserve banking amplifies the effects of these actions on the money supply, which includes bank deposits as well as base money.

Constant market transactions by the monetary authority modify the supply of currency and this impacts other market variables such as short-term interest rates and the exchange rate.

The distinction between the various types of monetary policy lies primarily with the set of instruments and target variables that are used by the monetary authority to achieve their goals.

The different types of policy are also called monetary regimes, in parallel to exchange-rate regimes. A fixed exchange rate is also an exchange-rate regime; The gold standard results in a relatively fixed regime towards the currency of other countries on the gold standard and a floating regime towards those that are not. Targeting inflation, the price level or other monetary aggregates implies floating the exchange rate unless the management of the relevant foreign currencies is tracking exactly the same variables (such as a harmonized consumer price index).

Inflation targeting 
Under this policy approach, the target is to keep inflation, under a particular definition such as the Consumer Price Index, within a desired range.

The inflation target is achieved through periodic adjustments to the central bank interest rate target. The interest rate used is generally the overnight rate at which banks lend to each other overnight for cash flow purposes. Depending on the country this particular interest rate might be called the cash rate or something similar.

As the Fisher effect model explains, the equation linking inflation with interest rates is the following:

π = i – r

where π is the inflation rate, i is the home nominal interest rate set by the central bank, and r is the real interest rate. Using i as an anchor, central banks can influence π.
Central banks can choose to maintain a fixed interest rate at all times, or just temporarily. The duration of this policy varies, because of the simplicity associated with changing the nominal interest rate.

The interest rate target is maintained for a specific duration using open market operations. Typically the duration that the interest rate target is kept constant will vary between months and years. This interest rate target is usually reviewed on a monthly or quarterly basis by a policy committee.

Changes to the interest rate target are made in response to various market indicators in an attempt to forecast economic trends and in so doing keep the market on track towards achieving the defined inflation target. For example, one simple method of inflation targeting called the Taylor rule adjusts the interest rate in response to changes in the inflation rate and the output gap. The rule was proposed by John B. Taylor of Stanford University.

The inflation targeting approach to monetary policy approach was pioneered in New Zealand. It has been used in Australia, Brazil, Canada, Chile, Colombia, the Czech Republic, Hungary, New Zealand, Norway, Iceland, India, Philippines, Poland, Sweden, South Africa, Turkey, and the United Kingdom. Since 1990, an increasing number of countries have switched to inflation targeting as its monetary policy framework. However, critics contend that there are unintended consequences to this approach such as fueling the increase in housing prices and contributing to wealth inequalities by supporting higher equity values.

Price level targeting
Price level targeting is a monetary policy that is similar to inflation targeting except that CPI growth in one year over or under the long term price level target is offset in subsequent years such that a targeted price-level trend is reached over time, e.g. five years, giving more certainty about future price increases to consumers. Under inflation targeting what happened in the immediate past years is not taken into account or adjusted for in the current and future years.

Uncertainty in price levels can create uncertainty around price and wage setting activity for firms and workers, and undermines any information that can be gained from relative prices, as it is more difficult for firms to determine if a change in the price of a good or service is because of inflation or other factors, such as an increase in the efficiency of factors of production, if inflation is high and volatile. An increase in inflation also leads to a decrease in the demand for money, as it reduces the incentive to hold money and increases transaction costs and shoe leather costs.

Monetary aggregates/money supply targeting
In the 1980s, several countries used an approach based on a constant growth in the money supply. This approach was refined to include different classes of money and credit (M0, M1 etc.). In the US this approach to monetary policy was discontinued with the selection of Alan Greenspan as Fed Chairman.

This approach is also sometimes called monetarism.

Central banks might choose to set a money supply growth target as a nominal anchor to keep prices stable in the long term. The quantity theory is a long run model, which links price levels to money supply and demand. Using this equation, we can rearrange to see the following:

π = μ − g,

where π is the inflation rate, μ is the money supply growth rate and g is the real output growth rate. This equation suggests that controlling the money supply's growth rate can ultimately lead to price stability in the long run. To use this nominal anchor, a central bank would need to set μ equal to a constant and commit to maintaining this target.

However, targeting the money supply growth rate is considered a weak policy, because it is not stably related to the real output growth, As a result, a higher output growth rate will result in a too low level of inflation. A low output growth rate will result in inflation that would be higher than the desired level.

While monetary policy typically focuses on a price signal of one form or another, this approach is focused on monetary quantities. As these quantities could have a role in the economy and business cycles depending on the households' risk aversion level, money is sometimes explicitly added in the central bank's reaction function. After the 1980s, however, central banks have shifted away from policies that focus on money supply targeting, because of the uncertainty that real output growth introduces. Some central banks, like the ECB, have chosen to combine a money supply anchor with other targets.

Nominal income/NGDP targeting

Related to money targeting, nominal income targeting (also called Nominal GDP or NGDP targeting), originally proposed by James Meade (1978) and James Tobin (1980), was advocated by Scott Sumner and reinforced by the market monetarist school of thought.

Central banks do not implement this monetary policy explicitly. However, numerous studies shown that such a monetary policy targeting better matches central bank losses and welfare optimizing monetary policy compared to more standard monetary policy targeting.

Fixed exchange rate targeting
This policy is based on maintaining a fixed exchange rate with a foreign currency. There are varying degrees of fixed exchange rates, which can be ranked in relation to how rigid the fixed exchange rate is with the anchor nation.

Under a system of fiat fixed rates, the local government or monetary authority declares a fixed exchange rate but does not actively buy or sell currency to maintain the rate. Instead, the rate is enforced by non-convertibility measures (e.g. capital controls, import/export licenses, etc.). In this case there is a black market exchange rate where the currency trades at its market/unofficial rate.

Under a system of fixed-convertibility, currency is bought and sold by the central bank or monetary authority on a daily basis to achieve the target exchange rate. This target rate may be a fixed level or a fixed band within which the exchange rate may fluctuate until the monetary authority intervenes to buy or sell as necessary to maintain the exchange rate within the band. (In this case, the fixed exchange rate with a fixed level can be seen as a special case of the fixed exchange rate with bands where the bands are set to zero.)

Under a system of fixed exchange rates maintained by a currency board every unit of local currency must be backed by a unit of foreign currency (correcting for the exchange rate). This ensures that the local monetary base does not inflate without being backed by hard currency and eliminates any worries about a run on the local currency by those wishing to convert the local currency to the hard (anchor) currency.

Under dollarization, foreign currency (usually the US dollar, hence the term "dollarization") is used freely as the medium of exchange either exclusively or in parallel with local currency. This outcome can come about because the local population has lost all faith in the local currency, or it may also be a policy of the government (usually to rein in inflation and import credible monetary policy).

Theoretically, using relative purchasing power parity (PPP), the rate of depreciation of the home country's currency must equal the inflation differential:

rate of depreciation = home inflation rate – foreign inflation rate,

which implies that

home inflation rate = foreign inflation rate + rate of depreciation.

The anchor variable is the rate of depreciation. Therefore, the rate of inflation at home must equal the rate of inflation in the foreign country plus the rate of depreciation of the exchange rate of the home country currency, relative to the other.

With a strict fixed exchange rate or a peg, the rate of depreciation of the exchange rate is set equal to zero. In the case of a crawling peg, the rate of depreciation is set equal to a constant. With a limited flexible band, the rate of depreciation is allowed to fluctuate within a given range.

By fixing the rate of depreciation, PPP theory concludes that the home country's inflation rate must depend on the foreign country's.

Countries may decide to use a fixed exchange rate monetary regime in order to take advantage of price stability and control inflation. In practice, more than half of nations’ monetary regimes use fixed exchange rate anchoring.

These policies often abdicate monetary policy to the foreign monetary authority or government as monetary policy in the pegging nation must align with monetary policy in the anchor nation to maintain the exchange rate. The degree to which local monetary policy becomes dependent on the anchor nation depends on factors such as capital mobility, openness, credit channels and other economic factors.

In practice
Nominal anchors are possible with various exchange rate regimes.

Following the collapse of Bretton Woods, nominal anchoring has grown in importance for monetary policy makers and inflation reduction. Particularly, governments sought to use anchoring in order to curtail rapid and high inflation during the 1970s and 1980s. By the 1990s, countries began to explicitly set credible nominal anchors. In addition, many countries chose a mix of more than one target, as well as implicit targets. As a result, after the 1970s global inflation rates, on average, decreased gradually and central banks gained credibility and increasing independence.

The Global Financial Crisis of 2008 sparked controversy over the use and flexibility of inflation nominal anchoring. Many economists argued that inflation targets were set too low by many monetary regimes. During the crisis, many inflation-anchoring countries reached the lower bound of zero rates, resulting in inflation rates decreasing to almost zero or even deflation.

Implications
The anchors discussed in this article suggest that keeping inflation at the desired level is feasible by setting a target interest rate, money supply growth rate, price level, or rate of depreciation. However, these anchors are only valid if a central bank commits to maintaining them. This, in turn, requires that the central bank abandon their monetary policy autonomy in the long run. Should a central bank use one of these anchors to maintain a target inflation rate, they would have to forfeit using other policies. Using these anchors may prove more complicated for certain exchange rate regimes. Freely floating or managed floating regimes have more options to affect their inflation, because they enjoy more flexibility than a pegged currency or a country without a currency. The latter regimes would have to implement an exchange rate target to influence their inflation, as none of the other instruments are available to them.

Credibility

The short-term effects of monetary policy can be influenced by the degree to which announcements of new policy are deemed credible. In particular, when an anti-inflation policy is announced by a central bank, in the absence of credibility in the eyes of the public inflationary expectations will not drop, and the short-run effect of the announcement and a subsequent sustained anti-inflation policy is likely to be a combination of somewhat lower inflation and higher unemployment (see Phillips curve § NAIRU and rational expectations). But if the policy announcement is deemed credible, inflationary expectations will drop commensurately with the announced policy intent, and inflation is likely to come down more quickly and without so much of a cost in terms of unemployment.

Thus there can be an advantage to having the central bank be independent of the political authority, to shield it from the prospect of political pressure to reverse the direction of the policy. But even with a seemingly independent central bank, a central bank whose hands are not tied to the anti-inflation policy might be deemed as not fully credible; in this case there is an advantage to be had by the central bank being in some way bound to follow through on its policy pronouncements, lending it credibility.

There is very strong consensus among economists that an independent central bank can run a more credible monetary policy, making market expectations more responsive to signals from the central bank.

Contexts

In international economics
Optimal monetary policy in international economics is concerned with the question of how monetary policy should be conducted in interdependent open economies. The classical view holds that international macroeconomic interdependence is only relevant if it affects domestic output gaps and inflation, and monetary policy prescriptions can abstract from openness without harm. This view rests on two implicit assumptions: a high responsiveness of import prices to the exchange rate, i.e. producer currency pricing (PCP), and frictionless international financial markets supporting the efficiency of flexible price allocation. The violation or distortion of these assumptions found in empirical research is the subject of a substantial part of the international optimal monetary policy literature. The policy trade-offs specific to this international perspective are threefold:

First, research suggests only a weak reflection of exchange rate movements in import prices, lending credibility to the opposed theory of local currency pricing (LCP). The consequence is a departure from the classical view in the form of a trade-off between output gaps and misalignments in international relative prices, shifting monetary policy to CPI inflation control and real exchange rate stabilization.

Second, another specificity of international optimal monetary policy is the issue of strategic interactions and competitive devaluations, which is due to cross-border spillovers in quantities and prices. Therein, the national authorities of different countries face incentives to manipulate the terms of trade to increase national welfare in the absence of international policy coordination. Even though the gains of international policy coordination might be small, such gains may become very relevant if balanced against incentives for international noncooperation.

Third, open economies face policy trade-offs if asset market distortions prevent global efficient allocation. Even though the real exchange rate absorbs shocks in current and expected fundamentals, its adjustment does not necessarily result in a desirable allocation and may even exacerbate the misallocation of consumption and employment at both the domestic and global level. This is because, relative to the case of complete markets, both the Phillips curve and the loss function include a welfare-relevant measure of cross-country imbalances. Consequently, this results in domestic goals, e.g. output gaps or inflation, being traded-off against the stabilization of external variables such as the terms of trade or the demand gap. Hence, the optimal monetary policy in this case consists of redressing demand imbalances and/or correcting international relative prices at the cost of some inflation.

Corsetti, Dedola and Leduc (2011) summarize the status quo of research on international monetary policy prescriptions: "Optimal monetary policy thus should target a combination of inward-looking variables such as output gap and inflation, with currency misalignment and cross-country demand misallocation, by leaning against the wind of misaligned exchange rates and international imbalances." This is main factor in country money status.

In developing countries
Developing countries may have problems establishing an effective operating monetary policy. The primary difficulty is that few developing countries have deep markets in government debt. The matter is further complicated by the difficulties in forecasting money demand and fiscal pressure to levy the inflation tax by expanding the base rapidly. In general, the central banks in many developing countries have poor records in managing monetary policy. This is often because the monetary authorities in developing countries are mostly not independent of the government, so good monetary policy takes a backseat to the political desires of the government or is used to pursue other non-monetary goals. For this and other reasons, developing countries that want to establish credible monetary policy may institute a currency board or adopt dollarization. This can avoid interference from the government and may lead to the adoption of monetary policy as carried out in the anchor nation. Recent attempts at liberalizing and reform of financial markets (particularly the recapitalization of banks and other financial institutions in Nigeria and elsewhere) are gradually providing the latitude required to implement monetary policy frameworks by the relevant central banks.

Trends

Transparency
Beginning with New Zealand in 1990, central banks began adopting formal, public inflation targets with the goal of making the outcomes, if not the process, of monetary policy more transparent. In other words, a central bank may have an inflation target of 2% for a given year, and if inflation turns out to be 5%, then the central bank will typically have to submit an explanation. The Bank of England exemplifies both these trends. It became independent of government through the Bank of England Act 1998 and adopted an inflation target of 2.5% RPI, revised to 2% of CPI in 2003. The success of inflation targeting in the United Kingdom has been attributed to the Bank of England's focus on transparency. The Bank of England has been a leader in producing innovative ways of communicating information to the public, especially through its Inflation Report, which have been emulated by many other central banks.

The European Central Bank adopted, in 1998, a definition of price stability within the Eurozone as inflation of under 2% HICP. In 2003, this was revised to inflation below, but close to, 2% over the medium term. Since then, the target of 2% has become common for other major central banks, including the Federal Reserve (since January 2012) and Bank of Japan (since January 2013).

Effect on business cycles
There continues to be some debate about whether monetary policy can (or should) smooth business cycles. A central conjecture of Keynesian economics is that the central bank can stimulate aggregate demand in the short run, because a significant number of prices in the economy are fixed in the short run and firms will produce as many goods and services as are demanded (in the long run, however, money is neutral, as in the neoclassical model). However, some economists from the new classical school contend that central banks cannot affect business cycles.

Behavioral monetary policy
Conventional macroeconomic models assume that all agents in an economy are fully rational. A rational agent has clear preferences, models uncertainty via expected values of variables or functions of variables, and always chooses to perform the action with the optimal expected outcome for itself among all feasible actions – they maximize their utility. Monetary policy analysis and decisions hence traditionally rely on this New Classical approach.

However, as studied by the field of behavioral economics that takes into account the concept of bounded rationality, people often deviate from the way that these neoclassical theories assume. Humans are generally not able to react fully rational to the world around them – they do not make decisions in the rational way commonly envisioned in standard macroeconomic models. People have time limitations, cognitive biases, care about issues like fairness and equity and follow rules of thumb (heuristics).

This has implications for the conduct of monetary policy. Monetary policy is the final outcome of a complex interaction between monetary institutions, central banker preferences and policy rules, and hence human decision-making plays an important role. It is more and more recognized that the standard rational approach does not provide an optimal foundation for monetary policy actions. These models fail to address important human anomalies and behavioral drivers that explain monetary policy decisions.

An example of a behavioral bias that characterizes the behavior of central bankers is loss aversion: for every monetary policy choice, losses loom larger than gains, and both are evaluated with respect to the status quo. One result of loss aversion is that when gains and losses are symmetric or nearly so, risk aversion may set in. Loss aversion can be found in multiple contexts in monetary policy. The "hard fought" battle against the Great Inflation, for instance, might cause a bias against policies that risk greater inflation.
Another common finding in behavioral studies is that individuals regularly offer estimates of their own ability, competence, or judgments that far exceed an objective assessment: they are overconfident. Central bank policymakers may fall victim to overconfidence in managing the macroeconomy in terms of timing, magnitude, and even the qualitative impact of interventions. Overconfidence can result in actions of the central bank that are either "too little" or "too much". When policymakers believe their actions will have larger effects than objective analysis would indicate, this results in too little intervention. Overconfidence can, for instance, cause problems when relying on interest rates to gauge the stance of monetary policy: low rates might mean that policy is easy, but they could also signal a weak economy.

These are examples of how behavioral phenomena may have a substantial influence on monetary policy. Monetary policy analyses should thus account for the fact that policymakers (or central bankers) are individuals and prone to biases and temptations that can sensibly influence their ultimate choices in the setting of macroeconomic and/or interest rate targets.

See also

 Economic policy
 Fiscal policy
 Forward guidance
 Interaction between monetary and fiscal policies
 Interest on excess reserves
 Macroeconomic model
 Monetary conditions index
 Monetary system
 Monetary reform
 Monetary transmission mechanism
 Negative interest on excess reserves
 Gold standard

US specific:
 Greenspan put
 Free silver

References

External links

 
Mankiw, N. Gregory, and Ricardo Reis. 2018. "Friedman's Presidential Address in the Evolution of Macroeconomic Thought." Journal of Economic Perspectives 32(1): 81–96.
 Bank for International Settlements

 
Macroeconomic policy
Public finance